The green fan-throated lizard (Ptyctolaemus gularis) is a species of agamid lizard found in Bangladesh, China (Tibet), India (Northeast- Arunachal Pradesh, Assam, Tripura, Khasi Hills, Mizoram) and Myanmar (Kachin, Chin), and possibly in Bhutan. The type locality, "Calcutta", is in error fide Zhao & Adler 1993; Ananjeva & Stuart (2001) give it as Margherita, in Patkai Mountains, Upper Assam.

Ptyctolaemus gularis is the type species of the genus Ptyctolaemus.

References

Ptyctolaemus
Reptiles of Bangladesh
Reptiles of Myanmar
Reptiles of China
Reptiles of India
Reptiles described in 1864
Taxa named by Wilhelm Peters